Slimane Zeghidour (Arabic: سليمان زغيدور) is a journalist, born in the Babor (Kabylia) region, and has lived in France 40 years ago. He is currently Chief Editor of TV5 Monde (French: TV5 MONDE) in addition to being a researcher at the French Institute of International and Strategic Research. And he was a teacher of the geopolitical of religions at the Universities of Poitiers in France.

Career 
Zeghidour began his professional career as a reporter for numerous international newspapers. He conducted many major investigations for 25 years on Latin America, the Middle East, Central Asia and Russia, As well as specializing in the reality and life of Latino Americans of Arab origin.

Opinions 
Slimane Zeghidour believes that the far-right parties in Europe play with identity card and Christian values, and accuse Islam of being their enemy, who threatens their identity. In his definition, Suleiman believes that identity is an ideological concept rather than a reality. And all the answers to what identity is will be ideological, not real at the same time, he advises to not confuse the concept of identity with heritage.According to what Suleiman sees, that identity changes and cannot be fixed, there is no single identity, and it cannot be determined only through religion, culture, or language, because everything creates identity. 

Regarding the revolutions in the Arab countries, especially the revolutions of the Arab Spring. Zeghidour, sees or rather considered that what's is happening in the Arab countries is not necessarily a revolution, but rather a reaction to every case of asphyxiation and accumulation resulting from the difficult conditions experienced by the Arab peoples. He criticizes the revolutionary’s perception of the revolution and their failure to plan for what is going on. And That's why he insists on calling what's happening on the public outrage that has resulted from the accumulation of difficulties and disappointments, but at the same time, however, it stresses that these protests are far better than the stalemate in the Arab countries.

For Slimane Zeghidour, religion is not a source of real conflict. He also emphasizes that the Palestinian-Israeli conflict is not a religious conflict, and Jews are not trying to bring Palestinian Muslims and Christians into Judaism and vice versa. He's also mentioned that Jews are not trying to demolish mosques and expel Muslims, and Muslims also did not want to demolish synagogues and expel Jews from them. The problem concerns the sense of patriotism, that is, the conflict over a very small land of six and a half million Israelis and five and a half million Palestinians. That’s about 12 million people in 34,000 square kilometers.

List of his works 
Slimane Zeghidour has published several books, perhaps the most notably:

 Daily life in Mecca, Muhammad to this day (Arabic: alhayaat alyawmia fi maka, muhamad hataa yawmina hadha).
 Islam (Arabic: al'iislam).
 The man who wanted to meet the God (Arabic: alrajul aladhi 'arad 'an yaltaqi al'iilah).

References 

Algerian journalists
Algerian writers in French
1953 births
Living people